Wang Mu may refer to:

Queen Mother of the West, Chinese deity
Hyejong of Goryeo (912–945), king of Goryeo